Double Platinum is the first greatest hits album by the American hard rock band Kiss, released in 1978.
Many of the songs on Double Platinum were remixed and differed from their original versions: in the case of "Strutter," it was re-recorded with a slight disco beat and dubbed "Strutter '78." Other songs ("Hard Luck Woman," "Detroit Rock City") had sections completely removed, while the beginning of "Black Diamond" was repeated at the end, fading out at the start of the first verse and giving the song a "wrap around" feel.

The Japanese single release of "Strutter '78" includes a different version to that on the album: faster and shorter, with an altered guitar solo, plus a more prominent hi-hat (cymbal) sound throughout.

Release and reception

The original vinyl release, in a gatefold sleeve, had an embossed, silver-foiled sleeve, with the band members in bas-relief inside. The album was packaged with a printed "Platinum Award" thanking the Kiss Army for making the band a "Double Platinum Success". Later reissues would retain the gatefold sleeve but replaced the logo with a printed, red-type version and the band members were now represented inside by photos rather than the base illustrations. When the album was remastered for CD in the US in 1997, it mimicked the original vinyl.

The album was certified Platinum on May 16, 1978, by the RIAA. In Canada, it was certified Gold on June 1, 1978, after shipping 50,000 copies. The album is one of the band's best catalog sellers, with 522,000 copies sold from 1991 to March 2012 only. It has been speculated that US sales have reached double platinum level (with at least 478,000 sold between 1978 and 1991), however it has not been re-certified since 1978.

Stephen Thomas Erlewine of AllMusic writes: "If 'Strutter' was represented by the original version, instead of a pointless 1978 remake—which was recorded only to entice collectors into buying an album of music they already owned—Double Platinum would have been a definitive collection, but as it stands, it's simply a very, very good overview."

Rolling Stone writes "Kiss's greatest-hits collections have all been conspicuously incomplete as if it hates the idea of anyone buying just one Kiss album, but Double Platinum is the most solid, though not as much fun as Alive!"

Track listing
All credits adapted from the original release.

Personnel
Kiss
 Paul Stanley – vocals, rhythm guitar, first guitar solo (track 10), guitar solo (track 18), 12-string acoustic guitar (tracks 3, 10 and 20), bass (track 6)
 Gene Simmons – vocals, bass
 Peter Criss – drums, vocals
 Ace Frehley – lead guitar, acoustic guitar (tracks 3, 14 and 18), backing vocals

Additional personnel
 Bob Ezrin – keyboards (tracks 7 and 16)
 Dick Wagner – acoustic guitar (track 16)
 New York Philharmonic – orchestra (track 16)
 Eddie Kramer – keyboards (track 6)
 Warren Dewey – fire engine sound effects (track 8)

Production
 Sean Delaney and Mike Stone – remixing of all tracks at Trident Studios, London, England
 Jimmy Ienner – executive producer

Charts

Album

Singles

Certifications

References 

1978 greatest hits albums
Albums produced by Bob Ezrin
Albums produced by Eddie Kramer
Kiss (band) compilation albums
Casablanca Records compilation albums